Corey John Fischer (February 28, 1945 – June 6, 2020) was an American actor.

Early life and education
Fischer was born in Los Angeles, California. He earned a bachelor of arts degree in French and Theatre Arts from UCLA.

Career
In the mid-1960s, he worked in Los Angeles in improvisational theatre, notably with The Committee, and went on to work in film and television. An early film appearance was in the biker cult film Naked Angels, and an early television appearance was in a 1966 episode of Daniel Boone.

Fischer appeared in Robert Altman's first three Hollywood movies: MASH, Brewster McCloud, and McCabe and Mrs. Miller and many of the best-known TV comedies of the 1970s, including All in the Family, Sanford and Son and Barney Miller as well as the TV version of M*A*S*H. In 1972-75 he played Givits, a guitar-playing ex-rabbinical student in Sunshine starting with the groundbreaking TV movie that became the prototype for a number of "Disease-of-the-Week" movies that followed. He continued to play Givits in the short-lived spin-off series, also titled Sunshine,  (13 episodes) and, finally, a second TV movie, Sunshine Christmas.

In 1976 Fischer worked with LA's ProVisional Theatre, an experimental, political ensemble. With them, he toured nationally in America Piece by Susan Yankowitz and the company-created Voice of the People.  He was then invited to become part of The Winter Project by director Joseph Chaikin. Relocating to New York for two years, he participated in Chaikin's project and acted in Chaikin's production of The Dybbuk at the Public Theater.
 
In 1978, he returned to Los Angeles, where, with Albert Greenberg and Naomi Newman, he co-founded Traveling Jewish Theatre (TJT), later known as The Jewish Theatre San Francisco. In 1982 TJT moved to San Francisco where Fischer continued to act, write and direct theatre and to act in film and television. He appeared in the 2012 feature film The Five-Year Engagement.

Fischer's one-man show Sometimes We Need a Story More Than Food was voted one of the ten best productions of 1993 by the Los Angeles Times and won a Marin County playwriting fellowship. His play See Under: Love, an adaptation of the novel by Israeli author David Grossman, was one of six winners of the Kennedy Center Fund for New American Plays Award in 1999. It was produced by TJT in 2001 and is anthologized in 9 Contemporary Jewish Plays. In 2000, the San Francisco Bay Guardian voted him one of the year's best directors for God's Donkey, an original TJT production. In 2001, his play, See Under: Love was listed as one of the year's ten best plays by the San Francisco Chronicle and was nominated by the Association of American Drama Critics as Best Play of 2001.

His last work was as a playwright and director of In the Maze of Our Own Lives, a play inspired by the story of the Group Theatre which was produced in October 2011, to launch TJT's 34th season. This was TJT's last as a producing organization.

Filmography

References

External links

 

1945 births
2020 deaths
Male actors from Los Angeles
American television writers
Jewish American male actors
Male actors from San Francisco
UCLA Film School alumni
Screenwriters from California
American male television writers
20th-century American male actors
20th-century American screenwriters
20th-century American dramatists and playwrights
20th-century American male writers
21st-century American dramatists and playwrights
21st-century American male actors
21st-century American male writers
Writers from Los Angeles
Writers from San Francisco
21st-century American Jews